Candida Casa was the name given to the church established by St Ninian in Whithorn, Galloway, southern Scotland, in the mid fifth century AD.

History
Whithorn, an early trading center, precedes the island of Iona by 150 years as a birthplace of Scottish Christianity. In 397, St Ninian established the first Christian mission north of Hadrian's Wall here, while the Roman legions still occupied Britain. He erected a small stone church known as the "Candida Casa", or White House, which was Scotland's first Christian building, and the first Christian settlement north of Hadrian's Wall. The church site quickly grew to prominence in the early medieval period, becoming a cathedral and monastery, and remaining a centre for pilgrimage despite the unstable political situation in the region.

At Whithorn, many monks were trained who later went into the missionary field to become famous apostles of Ireland and Alba, even as far north as the misty Orkney and Shetland Islands. Saint Éogan, founder of the monastery of Ardstraw, was an Irishman who lived in the sixth century AD and was said to have been taken by pirates to Britain. On obtaining his freedom, he went to study at Candida Casa. Bishop Healy identifies the site with the great seminary of Rosnat, "...and undoubtedly was one of the chief sources from which Irish monasticism was derived."

Pottery and glass from the Mediterranean and Western France reached this early Christian monastery and many of the monks may have come from France itself, bringing new technology and crafts with them.

Whithorn and the surrounding area passed from Brythonic to Northumbrian to Norse control before finally returning to local control by 1100 AD, by which time the area was part of the Kingdom of Scots.

The bishopric of Whithorn was reestablished in 1128, and a new cathedral and adjoining priory were built on the site.

The site fell into disrepair through the Scottish Reformation and beyond. "Whithorn Priory and Museum" encompasses the ruins and is maintained by Historic Environment Scotland. Adjoining this is "St Ninians's Priory", built in 1822 as the church of Whithorn Church of Scotland parish, and still in use .

References

Medieval cathedrals in Scotland
Churches in Dumfries and Galloway
5th-century churches
Former Christian monasteries in Scotland
Whithorn